Hyllus remotus is a jumping spider species in the genus Hyllus that lives in Nigeria. The female was first described in 2011.

References

Endemic fauna of Nigeria
Fauna of Nigeria
Salticidae
Spiders of Africa
Spiders described in 2011
Taxa named by Wanda Wesołowska